The Cocioc is a left tributary of the river Sabar in Romania. It flows into the Sabar in Valea Dragului.

References

Rivers of Romania
Rivers of Ilfov County
Rivers of Giurgiu County